In mathematics, a reversible diffusion is a specific example of a reversible stochastic process.  Reversible diffusions have an elegant characterization due to the Russian mathematician Andrey Nikolaevich Kolmogorov.

Kolmogorov's characterization of reversible diffusions

Let B denote a d-dimensional standard Brownian motion; let b : Rd → Rd be a Lipschitz continuous vector field.  Let X : [0, +∞) × Ω → Rd be an Itō diffusion defined on a probability space (Ω, Σ, P) and solving the Itō stochastic differential equation

with square-integrable initial condition, i.e. X0 ∈ L2(Ω, Σ, P; Rd).  Then the following are equivalent:

 The process X is reversible with stationary distribution μ on Rd.
 There exists a scalar potential Φ : Rd → R such that b = −∇Φ, μ has Radon–Nikodym derivative

and

(Of course, the condition that b be the negative of the gradient of Φ only determines Φ up to an additive constant; this constant may be chosen so that exp(−2Φ(·)) is a probability density function with integral 1.)

References

  (See theorem 1.4)

Stochastic differential equations
Probability theorems